Agnes Louise Baldwin Webb (March 24, 1926 – June 7, 2001) was an American women's basketball player, who played on the first United States women's national basketball team. Baldwin played basketball at Nashville Business College, which was a perennial powerhouse in the Amateur Athletic Union. Baldwin was part of the national team which won the first women's world basketball championship.

Webb died on June 7, 2001, at the age of 75.

References

1926 births
2001 deaths
21st-century American women
American women's basketball players
Basketball players from Tennessee
Guards (basketball)
United States women's national basketball team players